The Trelawny League is an English association football league comprising clubs from West Cornwall, formed from a merger between the Mining League and the Falmouth & Helston League at the end of the 2010–11 season. The new Trelawny League commenced in the 2011–12 season after the Falmouth and Helston League celebrated its 50th anniversary.

The league originally consisted of seven divisions, but was reduced to six for the 2012–13 season, and further reduced to five for the 2016–17 season, and further reduced to four for the 2019–20 season after the creation of the St Piran League. The top division sits at the 13th tier of the English football league system. Up to two teams from the Premier Division can be promoted to the Cornwall Combination providing they finish in the top three and satisfy ground grading requirements.

Member clubs 2022–23

Premier Division
Camborne School of Mines
Frogpool & Cusgarne
Illogan Royal British Legion Reserves
Ludgvan Reserves
Mawnan Reserves
Redruth United Reserves
Stithians
Threemilestone
Troon
West Cornwall

Division One
Chacewater
Constantine
Falmouth United
New Inn Titans
Newlyn Non-Athletico
Penzance Reserves
Perranwell Reserves
Rosudgeon Reserves
St Buryan
St. Day 3rds

Division Two
Carharrack
Falmouth DC
Goonhavern Athletic Reserves
Holman SC
Probus
RNAS Culdrose Reserves
St. Erme
St Ives Town Reserves
Threemilestone Reserves
Tregony
Wendron United 4ths

Division Three
Constantine Reserves
Dropship
Falmouth United Reserves
Frogpool & Cusgarne Reserves
Lanner
Lizard Argyle Reserves
Mount Ambrose
St. Agnes 3rds
St Ives Mariners
St Keverne
Troon Reserves

Division Four
Dropship Reserves
Helston Raiders
Mullion 3rds
Pendeen Rovers Reserves
Penryn Athletic Reserves
Perranporth Reserves
Praze-an-Beeble Reserves
Ruan Minor
St Just Reserves
Storm
Wendron United 5ths

Champions

References

External links

 FA Fulltime

4
Recurring sporting events established in 2011